John Savile, 1st Earl of Mexborough (December 1719 – 17 February 1778), known as The Lord Pollington between 1753 and 1766, was a British peer and Member of Parliament.

Savile was the eldest son of Charles Savile of Methley (1676–1741). He entered Parliament in 1747 as member for Hedon in East Yorkshire, and subsequently also represented New Shoreham. In 1749 he was appointed a Knight Companion of the Order of the Bath. In November 1753 he was raised to the Peerage of Ireland as Baron Pollington of Longford in the County of Longford whilst remaining an MP.  In February 1766 he was created Viscount Pollington of Ferns in the County of Wexford and Earl of Mexborough of Lifford in the County of Donegal, again in the Irish peerage.

Mexborough was a friend and patron of the playwright and actor-manager Samuel Foote; it was while on a visit to Mexborough in 1766 that Foote lost a leg in a riding accident.

He married Sarah Delaval (d. 1821) in 1760, and they had three sons:

 John Savile, 2nd Earl of Mexborough (1761–1830).
 Hon. Henry Savile (1763–1828).
 Hon. Charles Savile (1774–1807).

References
 

|-

|-

Mexborough, John Savile, 1st Earl of
Mexborough, John Savile, 1st Earl of
Members of the Parliament of Great Britain for English constituencies
British MPs 1747–1754
British MPs 1761–1768
Savile, John, 01 Earl of Mexborough
Peers of Ireland created by George II
Earls of Mexborough